The Americas Zone is one of the three zones of regional Davis Cup competition in 2009.

In the Americas Zone there are four different groups in which teams compete against each other to advance to the next group.

Participating teams

Draw

Peru relegated to Group II in 2010.
Brazil and Ecuador advance to World Group Play-off.

First Round Matches

Uruguay vs. Colombia

Canada vs. Ecuador

Second Round Matches

Colombia vs. Brazil

Ecuador vs. Peru

First Round Play-offs Matches

Canada vs. Peru

Second Round Play-off Match

Uruguay vs. Peru

External links
Davis Cup draw details

Group I